An Undang  is a ruling chief or territorial chief who still play an important role in the state of Negeri Sembilan, Malaysia. The name is believed to be derived from the Malay word undang-undang meaning "law".

The Minangkabau who settled at Negeri Sembilan, in present-day Malaysia at the end of the 17th century ruled by a "penghulu" or headman who was chosen from the noble families of Sakai and Jakun called Biduanda.  These "penghulus", notably that of Sungai Ujong, Jelebu, Johol and Rembau became powerful enough to exalt themselves above other "penghulus". These penghulus later acknowledged by the Sultan of the old Johor Empire as a sovereign in their own territory. By the early part of the 18th century, the leaders of these four territories using the title "Undang".

Malaysia's modern day constitution confirms the status of the Undang under Article 71, 160, 181 and Eight Schedule of Federal Constitution as Malay Ruler within the Federation. Undangs are still chosen from amongst certain noble families in the state, the succession being both matrilineal and elective following the Adat Purbakala.

Inheritance and titles
The ruling chiefs are selected among the nobility in each luak (district), following matrilineal inheritance, part of the state's adat perpatih customs. 
 The Undang of Sungai Ujong is chosen among the Waris Hulu and Waris Hilir families from the noble House of Klana and inherits the title Dato' Klana Petra. 
 The Undang of Jelebu is elected among the three noble houses, Waris Ulu Jelebu, Waris Sarin and Waris Kemin. 
 Undangs of Johol are a succession of members of two families in the female line which are Perut Gemencheh and Perut Johol. The son of the eldest sister of the incumbent is usually the heir. 
 The Undang of Rembau alternates between the two major noble houses in the Luak, namely the Waris Jakun (who inherit the title Dato' Lela Maharaja) and the Waris Jawa (Dato' Sedia di-Raja). As with the Undang of Johol, the son of the eldest sister of the incumbent is the heir in the family.

The senior wife of an Undang has the honorific title of "To' Puan".

Duties

The Undangs carry out duties such as co-head of state, co-head of Islam as state religion, upholding and safeguarding Bumiputera special position in Negeri Sembilan, attending the state opening of the legislative assembly and electing the Yang di-Pertuan Besar of Negeri Sembilan, who is also the co-head of state of Negeri Sembilan. The Undangs themselves cannot stand for election and their choice of ruler is limited to a male Muslim who is Malay and also a "lawfully begotten descendant of Raja Radin ibni Raja Lenggang".

References

Yang di-Pertuan Besar of Negeri Sembilan